St. Agatha High School was a coeducational Catholic high school in Redford, Michigan.  It closed and became St. Katharine Drexel High School in 2003.

References

Private high schools in Michigan
Defunct Catholic secondary schools in Michigan